Waka National Park is a national park in central Gabon. Waka protects over 1,000 km of rain forest in the Chaillu Massif.

One of the most striking features of this locality is the Ikobe-Ikoi-Onoi rift, which is deeply incised into the landscape.

References

External links 
 Wildlife Conservation Society
 Gabon National Parks

National parks of Gabon
Protected areas established in 2002
2002 establishments in Gabon